The fifth season of American animated comedy television series Regular Show, created by J. G. Quintel, originally aired on Cartoon Network in the United States. Quintel created the series' pilot using characters from his comedy shorts for the canceled anthology series The Cartoonstitute. He developed Regular Show from his own experiences in college. Simultaneously, several of the show's main characters originated from his animated shorts 2 in the AM PM and The Naïve Man from Lolliland. Following its fourth season's success, Regular Show was renewed for a fifth season on November 1, 2012. The season ran from September 2, 2013 to August 14, 2014 and was produced by Cartoon Network Studios.

Regular Shows fifth season was storyboarded and written by Calvin Wong, Toby Jones, Andres Salaff (who left to become a supervising director on Adventure Time), Madeline Queripel, Benton Connor, Hilary Florido (who moved on following this season to work on Steven Universe), Sarah Oleksyk (currently storyboard director for Sanjay and Craig), Minty Lewis, Ryan Pequin and Owen Dennis. For this season, the writers were Quintel, Mike Roth, John Infantino, Sean Szeles, Michele Cavin, and Matt Price, who is also the story editor. 

The season aired with the first episodes, "Laundry Woes" and "Silver Dude." The season contains a half-hour Halloween special entitled "Terror Tales of the Park III" that aired on October 21, 2013, a half-hour Thanksgiving episode titled "The Thanksgiving Special" that aired on November 25, 2013, and a half-hour special centered on Skips titled "Skips' Story" that aired on April 14, 2014.

Development

Concept
Two 23-year-old friends, a blue jay named Mordecai and a raccoon named Rigby, are employed as groundskeepers at a park and spend their days trying to slack off and entertain themselves by any means. This is much to the chagrin of their boss Benson and their coworker Skips, but the delight of Pops. Their other coworkers, Muscle Man (an overweight green man) and Hi-Five Ghost (a ghost with a hand extending from the top of his head) serve as their rivals.

Production
Many of the characters are loosely based on those developed for Quintel's student films at California Institute of the Arts: The Naive Man From Lolliland and 2 in the AM PM. Quintel pitched Regular Show for Cartoon Network's Cartoonstitute project, in which the network allowed artists to create pilots with no notes to be optioned as a show possibly. After being green-lit, Quintel recruited several indie comic book artists to compose the show's staff, as their style matched close to what he desired for the series. The season was storyboarded and written by Calvin Wong, Toby Jones, Andres Salaff, Madeline Queripel, Benton Connor, Hilary Florido, Sarah Oleksyk, Minty Lewis, Ryan Pequin, and Owen Dennis. For this season, the writers were Quintel, Mike Roth, John Infantino, Sean Szeles, Michele Cavin, and Matt Price, who is also the story editor while being produced by Cartoon Network Studios.

The fifth season of Regular Show was produced between October 2012 and August
2013.  It utilizes double entendres and mild language; Quintel stated that, although the network wanted to step up from the more child-oriented fare, some restrictions came with this switch.

Episodes

References

2013 American television seasons
2014 American television seasons
Regular Show seasons